Verín is a comarca in the Galician Province of Ourense. The overall population of this local region is 25,217 (2019).

Municipalities
Castrelo do Val, Cualedro, Laza, Monterrei, Oímbra, Riós, Verín and Vilardevós.

References 

Comarcas of the Province of Ourense